Albertina is a city in the Brazilian state of Minas Gerais. In 2020 its population was estimated to be 3,011.

Founded: 30 December 1962

References

Municipalities in Minas Gerais